Mount Oread  is a hill in Lawrence, Kansas upon which the University of Kansas, and parts of the city of Lawrence, Kansas are located. It sits on the water divide between the Kansas River and the Wakarusa River rivers.  It was named after the long defunct Oread Institute in Worcester, Massachusetts, where many of the settlers of Lawrence moved from prior to the American Civil War.  The hill was originally called Hogback Ridge by many Lawrence residents until the Oread name was adopted in 1864, two years after the university was founded.

For settlers going westward by wagon train on the Oregon Trail, "The Hill", as Mount Oread is now commonly referred to by Kansans, was the next big topographical challenge after crossing the Wakarusa River, which is today located two miles south of the city of Lawrence.

James Lane and Governor Charles Robinson erected a fort on the hill in the 1850s, during the Bleeding Kansas conflict in order to protect Lawrence. A 1857 Harper's Weekly report deemed the fort to be valueless as a military work. Governor Robinson's first home in Lawrence would be built on the hill, which was burned down on May 21st, 1855 by pro-slavery border ruffians. 

Mount Oread is perhaps best known for being the staging area of William Quantrill's raid into Lawrence on August 21, 1863, during the American Civil War. Presently, the campus of the University of Kansas (KU) rests on Mount Oread.

Mount Oread is the type locality for the Oread Limestone, and so, gives its name to the Oread Escarpment rising in this region of Kansas. Oread Limestone was quarried from the hilltop and used in the earliest of the campus buildings of KU, including Spooner Hall and Dyche Hall.

See also
 Oread
 Mount Oread Civil War posts

References

External links
Lawrence Kansas looking northeast from Mt. Oread (1859)
Mt. Oread campus buildings at the University of Kansas.
TopoQuest map of Mt. Oread
 Mount Oread trail route marker for KU GIS Day 2006 social geocoding pioneers

Bleeding Kansas
Lawrence, Kansas
Hills of Kansas
Kansas in the American Civil War
Hydrology
Oregon Trail
Drainage divides
Landforms of Douglas County, Kansas